Zhu Bajie, also named Zhu Wuneng (he has two Buddhist Dharma names, one, "Wuneng" (悟能) given to him by the bodhisattva, Guanyin, and one, "Bajie" (八戒) given to him by Tang Sanzang/Tripiṭaka), is one of the three helpers of the aforementioned-Tang Sanzang and a major character of the 16th century novel Journey to the West. Zhu means "swine" and Bajie means "eight precepts". Prior to his being recruited by the bodhisattva, Guanyin, Zhu Bajie went by "Zhu Ganglie" (literally "Strong-Maned Pig").  Buddhist scholars consider that both expressions are related to "Śīla pāramitā". In many English versions of the story, Zhu Bajie is called "Monk Pig", "Pig", "Piggy", or "Pigsy".

Zhu Bajie is a complex and developed character in the novel. He looks like a terrible humanoid-pig monster, part human and part pig (reminiscent of Jimmy Squarefoot from Manx folklore), who often gets himself and his companions into trouble through his laziness, gluttony, and propensity for lusting after pretty women. He is jealous of Sun Wukong and always tries to bring him down.

His Buddhist name "Zhu Wuneng", given by Bodhisattva Guanyin, means "pig (reincarnated) who is aware of ability" or "pig who rises to power", a reference to the fact that he values himself so much as to forget his own grisly appearance. Tang Sanzang gave him the nickname Bājiè which means "eight restraints" or "eight commandments" to remind him of his Buddhist diet.

In the original Chinese novel, he is often called dāizi, meaning "idiot". Sun Wukong, Tang Sanzang, and even the author consistently refers to him as "the idiot" over the course of the story. Bodhisattvas and other heavenly beings usually refer to him as "Heavenly Tumbleweed", his former name when he was a heavenly marshal.

In modern times, Zhu Bajie is seen as a patron deity of masseuses, hostesses, and prostitutes within Taiwan and other parts of East Asia.

Character
Zhu Bajie originally held the title of Tiānpéng Yuánshuài (天篷元帅; lit. "Marshal Canopy"), commander-in-chief of 80,000 Celestial sailors. However, he was later banished for misbehavior. At a party organized for all the significant figures in Heaven, Bajie saw the goddess of the Moon for the first time and was captivated by her beauty. Following a drunken attempt to seduce her, she reported this to the Jade Emperor and thus he was banished to Earth. In popular retellings, Zhu Bajie was sentenced to a thousand lives where each life would end in a love tragedy. In some retellings of the story, his banishment is linked to Sun Wukong's downfall. In any case, he was exiled from Heaven and sent to be reincarnated on Earth, where by mishap he fell into a pig well and was reborn as a man-eating pig-monster known as Zhū Gāngliè (猪刚鬛 the "strong-maned pig").

In the earlier portions of Journey to the West, Wukong and Tang Sanzang come to Gao village and find that a daughter of the village elder had been kidnapped and the abductor left a note demanding marriage. In some versions of the story Bajie has convinced the elder to allow him to marry the daughter based on his ability to do large amounts of hard work due to his prodigious strength. The elder recants when he discovers that, although Zhu Bajie manages to do quite a lot of work in the fields, he manages to eat so much that the farm is losing money anyway. After some investigations, Wukong found out that Bajie was the "villain" behind this. He fought with Wukong, who learns after beating him that he has also been recruited by Guanyin to join their pilgrimage and make atonements for his past sins.

At the end of the novel, most of Bajie's fellow pilgrims achieve enlightenment and become arhats, but he does not; although much improved, he is still too much a creature of his base desires. He is instead rewarded for his part in the pilgrimage's success with a job as "Cleanser of the Altars" and all the leftovers he can eat. However, his actual rank in relation to the others is unclear, but possibly the lowest.

Pre-existence
In traditional Chinese Taoism, there is a divine goddess named Doumu Yuanjun (斗姆元君) who was acclaimed as the mother of all the constellations, even the Emperor Zi-Wei is her son. She has four faces while one of them is akin to a pig's face. Tiānpéng Yuánshuài (天篷元帅; lit. "Marshal Heavenly Mugwort") is one of her most significant understrappers, which is the head general of the North Pole.

According to the depiction in the chapter 217 of 《道法会元》, a biography of Taoism and Chinese mythical stories compiled in Ming Dynasty; Tiānpéng Yuánshuài was a blazing powerful marshal in the North Pole. A phrase depicts his appearance as:

He was scarily imposing with three heads and six arms, red hair, red armor all over; Holding a magic seal, an axe, a firm rope in left hands and a convulsion bell, a symbolic artifact of constellations and a long sword in right. He leads 360,000 warriors; travels along with scary and dark gas, in which there is a five-colored cloud. Numerous deities with great respect always greet his arrivals.

Under his reign, there are a mass of strong myrmidons, with a piece of description withdrawn from ancient books and records of Taoism, three of the most outstanding ones are:

 "Mahatma of heaven": with height of over a hundred feet, wearing a light-colored gown, disheveled long hair, could create incantatory power with his fingers, holding a sharp sword in his right hand.
 "The Great General of mixed pneuma": Wearing a high crest and golden corselet the whole body, equipped by a bow, an arrow, and a halberd.
 "Four-eyed thunder marshal": Aged, with four eyes and a walks with a crutch. Accompanied by two august emissaries.

Also, there are 36 generals and a group of Divine warriors under his dominion; anyhow, as is depicted in myth of Chinese Taoism, he is the commander of a huge deity system in the Northern Pole, in which a great number of valiant deity generals and warriors who all controlled by the Emperor Zi-Wei.

Nevertheless, Zhu Bajie was possibly influenced by Varaha, an avatar of the Hindu god Vishnu, whose name means "boar" in sanskrit, which is named after his form of a boar.

In the novel, after he is punished and becomes Zhu Bajie, there is an obvious recession in both his confidence and power which makes him less militant and lazier as we can find in many parts in the original passage. However, with the remains of power he used to have in his preexistence, he is still capable of fighting against most of the devils appear in their way of journey and in this regard, Sun Wukong always prefers to bring him together when having battles with enemies although they have intermittent personal conflicts all the way.

Nine-toothed rake

The nine-toothed rake is the primary weapon of Zhu Bajie. This phrase depicts the first point in which Bajie's legendary nine-toothed rake had been used:

In another passage, Pig tells of his legendary rake while battling against Sun Wukong:

During their journey, he atrociously kills many demons with his rake, usually with nine blood-spurting holes in their head.

Personality

Merits

Respectful
Despite his previous identity as a great marshal who was in charge of 80,000 celestial marines, he always claims Sun Wukong as "brother" with awe and respect while Sun has conflicts with him and often makes fun of him all the way. Of course, another reason for it is he already knows Sun's reputation of being a great fighter in his preexistence.

Soft-hearted
During the journey, many demons change their appearances into children and beautiful women, pretending to be in trouble to confuse them with the intention of eating their master Tang Sanzang. However, though Sun Wukong is capable of detecting demons, Zhu Bajie always manages to persuade his brother to release them rather than capturing or killing them, although his kindness often causes trouble and leads to disaster.

Optimistic

Though he is constantly captured by numerous demons throughout the journey, he still behaves normally; even when he is about to be eaten, he does not seem to be anxious compared to his other two mates. This is also related to his background as a marshal in preexistence; rich experience in coping with various incidents makes his emotions fluctuate less. In some readings of this book, it is said that Zhu Bajie deliberately does not use his real power on the journey as he knows every time Monkey King would come and save them all. Even if not, other deities would come and help them.

Demerits

Gluttony
As the proverb goes, eating is the most important thing in daily lives. Zhu Bajie in this regard is the best of the best. For example, in one part of the book, he obtains a watermelon and splits it into four pieces to share with his colleagues equally. When he finds watermelon too delicious after finishing his own slice, he finds excuses to eat each piece one by one until he finishes the whole watermelon. He has a big appetite, which is fairly visible in many parts of the story.

Laziness
Zhu Bajie is given to laziness. He seemingly never cares about their troubles and works, and always finds excuses to procrastinate their expedition. Every time the four of them arrive in another country, the local people always welcome them with food and accommodation because they come from the Great Tang Empire, which was both culturally and economically influential to all the surrounding areas at that time. Zhu Bajie hence tends to find excuses to persuade his master to stay several more days for better abodes and food due to his greediness.

Lust
When he was a marshal in heaven, he dallied with Chang'e, which was the reason for his banishment. After his reincarnation he drools everytime he meets beauties. Because of his lust the group often sinks into various troubles and even disasters.

All in all, he was given a name that means "eight resistances", which reminded him to resist temptations of the flesh, including lust, laziness, gluttony, and avarice.

See also
 List of media adaptations of Journey to the West

References

Journey to the West characters
Fictional Buddhist monks
Fictional Chinese people in literature
Fictional generals
Fictional pigs
Mythological pigs
Pigs in literature